Giuseppe Steiner can refer to:

 Giuseppe Steiner (bobsleigh) (born 1893), Italian Olympic bobsledder
 Giuseppe Steiner (skier) (born 1929), Italian Olympic skier